John Rudolph Sutermeister (March 16, 1803 – January 16, 1826) was an American jurist and poet.

Life 

Sutermeister was baptized at a Lutheran church in Curaçao, his birthplace, 17 April 1803. Upon arrival in Rhinebeck around 1812 he studied at the Lutheran church. In 1817 he was sent to boarding school in Cooperstown, New York. After studying alternately at the Rhinebeck Hartwick Academy, he studied law at Rhinebeck. In 1824 he began a tour through the western part of the state of New York to find a suitable location to establish itself as a lawyer. He settled in the same year in Syracuse, New York. However, the legal profession did not suit him and he then worked briefly as editor of the Syracuse Gazette. In July 1825 he left Syracuse to move to New York City where his friends had found a suitable and lucrative position for him. However, this was short-lived because six months later he died.

John made himself a poet deserving in his short life.

Work 

In 1824 Sutermeister wrote an Ode to Linnæus, 
which was also published in the American FarmerThe same year, he wrote the poem To a Humming Bird, which was published in John Keese's The Poets of America as well as in Anthony Benezet Cleveland's Studies in Poetry and ProseA year later, he wrote The Garden; his poems were published as Minor Poems (including A Contrasted Picture, The Lament (or A Lament), Faded Hours (The Careless Lover's Adieu) and in the Syracuse Gazette.

Poems (selection) 

 Ode to Linnæus. Celebration at Flushing, of the Birth-Day of Linnaeus. New-York Branch of the Linnaean Society of Paris, 1824, p. 14 (description at the Digital Public Library of America)
Published also in: American Farmer, no. 21, vol. 6, Baltimore, 13 August 1824, p. 161 (online)
 To a Humming Bird. (originally appeared in 1824) (Excerpt)
Published in: John Keese: The Poets of America, volume 1, S. Colman, 1840, p. 124-125.
And in: A. B. Cleveland: Studies in Poetry and Prose: Consisting of Selections Principally from American Writers, and Designed for the Highest Class in Schools. W. and J. Neal, 1832, p. 360.
 The Garden. (1825)
 Minor Poems.
 A Contrasted Picture. (p. 72-73.)
 The Lament or A Lament. (Digitalized by Gutenberg.org, including biographical background) (p. 73-74.)
 Faded Hours. (p. 74-75.) (Rufus Wilmot Griswold: The Poets and Poetry of America: To the Middle of the Nineteenth Century. A. Hart, 1852, p. 545.)
 The Careless Lover's Adieu

References

Bibliography and Weblinks 

 Samuel Kettell: Specimens of American poetry: with critical and biographical notices, in three volumes. Boston: S.G. Goodrich, 1829, p. 71-75. 
 Short biography, caribbean genealogy

1803 births
1826 deaths
19th-century American poets
American male poets
Writers from New York (state)
Lutheran poets
American Lutherans
Curaçao emigrants to the United States
Curaçao jurists
Curaçao poets
19th-century American male writers
19th-century Lutherans